Caecilia corpulenta is a species of caecilian in the family Caeciliidae. It is endemic to Colombia. Its natural habitats are subtropical or tropical moist montane forests, swamps, plantations, rural gardens, and heavily degraded former forest.

References

corpulenta
Amphibians of Colombia
Endemic fauna of Colombia
Taxa named by Edward Harrison Taylor
Amphibians described in 1968
Taxonomy articles created by Polbot